Hugó Gruber (28 May 1938 – 3 July 2012) was a Hungarian stage and film actor.

He was the Hungarian dubbing voice of Ian McDiarmid in the Star Wars Prequel Trilogy, and in Return of the Jedi VHS edition, 1992.

Selected filmography
 Szomszédok (1991-1993)

References

Bibliography
 Magyar színházművészeti lexikon. ed. Székely György. Budapest: Akadémiai. 1994.  
 MTI ki kicsoda 2009. Szerk. Hermann Péter. Budapest: Magyar Távirati Iroda. 2008.

External links

1938 births
2012 deaths
Hungarian male film actors
Hungarian male stage actors
Hungarian male voice actors
Male actors from Budapest